William John Hamilton  (5 July 1805 – 27 June 1867) was a British geologist who served as a Conservative Member of Parliament.

Early life 
Hamilton was born in Wishaw, Lanarkshire on 5 July 1805. He was the eldest son of William Richard Hamilton, FRS, and the former Julia Udny. His younger brothers were Alexander Edmund Hamilton (who drowned in India in 1827), Capt. Henry George Hamilton of the Royal Navy (father of Adm. Sir Frederick Hamilton), Charles Anthony Hamilton (who worked in the Privy Council office), Arthur Richard Hamilton, and Gen. Frederick William Hamilton.

His paternal grandfather was Anthony Hamilton, the Archdeacon of Colchester. His maternal grandparents were John Udny, British Counsul at Venice and Leghorn, and Selina Shore Clevland (a daughter of John Clevland MP). His uncle, Lt.-Col. John Robert Fullerton Udny inherited Udny Castle in Aberdeen from his uncle, Robert Udny, the prominent merchant and art collector.

He was educated at Charterhouse School and the University of Göttingen.

Career 
He became a fellow of the Geological Society of London in 1831. In 1835 he made a  geological tour of the Levant with Hugh Edwin Strickland, continuing on his own through Armenia and across Asia Minor. This journey was described in Researches in Asia Minor, Pontus, and Armenia (1842). Hamilton was the first known person to have successfully climbed Mount Erciyes.

He was a Conservative Member of Parliament (MP) for Newport, Isle of Wight, from 1841 to 1847.

Hamilton was president of the Royal Geographical Society for 1848–1849 and of the Geological Society between 1854 and 1866. He was elected a Fellow of the Royal Society in 1855. He was elected as a member of the American Philosophical Society in 1862.

He made excursions in France and Belgium and wrote on the rocks and minerals of Tuscany, the agate quarries of Oberstein, and on the geology of the Mayence basin and the Hesse-Kassel (or Hesse-Cassel) district.

Personal life 
On 26 April 1832, Hamilton married Martin Trotter, a daughter of John Trotter. Before her death in March 1833, they had a son:

 Robert William Hamilton  (1833–1883), who married Charlotte Maria Palmer, a daughter of Lt.-Col. George Palmer.

On 26 July 1838, he married the Hon. Margaret Frances Florence Dillon, a daughter of Henry Augustus Dillon-Lee, 13th Viscount Dillon, and Henrietta Browne (sister to Dominick Browne, 1st Baron Oranmore and Browne). They had six children:

 Margaret Wilhelmina Hamilton (d. 1915), who married Louis Eric Ames, son Henry Ames of Linden.
 Florence Selina Hamilton (d. 1904), who married Sir Thomas Villiers Lister, son of Thomas Henry Lister, in 1877.
 Victoria Henrietta Hamilton (d. 1917), who married of James Graham Goodenough (parents of Adm. Sir William Edmund Goodenough).
 Alexander Charles Hamilton (1840–1920), who successfully claimed the title of 10th Lord Belhaven and Stenton.
 Constantine Henry Hamilton (1843–1885), a Lieutenant-Colonel in the Royal Artillery who died unmarried.
 Archibald William Hamilton (1847–1886), who married Elizabeth Ann Billyard, daughter of W. Billyard, in 1869.

Hamilton died in London in 1867, his wife survived him.

Descendants
As his son Alexander died without surviving male issue, his grandson Robert Hamilton-Udny (son of his youngest son Archibald), inherited the title of 10th Lord Belhaven and Stenton.

References

External links

1805 births
1867 deaths
People from Wishaw
People educated at Charterhouse School
University of Göttingen alumni
British geologists
Conservative Party (UK) MPs for English constituencies
UK MPs 1841–1847
Fellows of the Geological Society of London
Presidents of the Geological Society of London
Fellows of the Royal Geographical Society
Presidents of the Royal Geographical Society
Fellows of the Royal Society
Members of Parliament for the Isle of Wight